Jeminay County or Jimunai County, is a county situated in the north of the Xinjiang Uyghur Autonomous Region and is under the administration of the Altay Prefecture.

A road border crossing into Kazakhstan is located in Jeminay town. The Kazakh settlement across the border is Maykapshagay near Zaysan in East Kazakhstan Region.

Administrative divisions 
 Town (镇 / بازارلىق / قالاشىع)
 Topterek (托普铁热克镇 / توپتېرەك بازىرى / توپتەرەك قالاشىعى)
 Jimunai (吉木乃镇 / جېمىنەي بازىرى / جەمەنەي قالاشىعى)
 Ulustay (乌拉斯特镇 / ئۇلاستاي بازىرى) [Formerly Topterek Township (托普铁热克乡  / توپتېرەك يېزىسى / توپتەرەك اۋىلى)]
 Township (乡 / يېزا / اۋىل)
 Tost Township (托斯特乡 / توست يېزىسى )
 Xalxikay Township (恰勒什海乡 / شالشىقاي يېزىسى / شالشىقاي اۋىلى)
 Kaerjiao Township (喀尔交乡 / قارجاۋ يېزىسى / قارجاۋ اۋىلى)
 Besterek Township (别斯铁热克乡 / بېستېرەك يېزىسى )
 Others
 兵团186团 (186-تۇەن مەيدانى)

Demographics

Population
Amongst the county's total population of 37,733, 19,090 of them were men while 18,643 were women. 13,209 people were Han Chinese while 24,524 belonged to the county's fifteen different ethnic minority groups. The Non-agricultural population has a total figure of 18,530 while the Farming population is 19,203; The Urban population accounts for 10,121 people. According to the 2005 census, the  native ethnic Kazaks, accounted for more than sixty percent of the county's total population figure.

Climate

References

External links
Xinjiang's Land Ports and Border Trade

County-level divisions of Xinjiang
China–Kazakhstan border crossings
Altay Prefecture